Sandra Vander-Heyden (born December 26, 1964, in Nashua, New Hampshire) is an American former field hockey player who competed in the 1988 Summer Olympics.

References

External links
 

1964 births
Living people
American female field hockey players
Olympic field hockey players of the United States
Field hockey players at the 1988 Summer Olympics
21st-century American women